The 2019–20 Seattle Redhawks men's basketball team represented Seattle University during the 2019–20 NCAA Division I men's basketball season. The Redhawks, led by third-year head coach Jim Hayford, played their home games at the Redhawk Center, with three home games at the ShoWare Center, as members of the Western Athletic Conference. They finished the season 14–15, 7–7 in WAC play to finish in a tie for fifth place. Due to irregularities in conference standings due to cancelled games, they were set to be the No. 3 seed in the WAC tournament, however, the tournament was cancelled amid the COVID-19 pandemic.

Previous season
They finished the season 18–15, 6–10 in WAC play to finish in a tie for seventh place. In the postseason, they were defeated by Grand Canyon in the 2019 WAC tournament. They received an invitation to the CIT where they lost in the first round to Presbyterian.

Roster

Schedule and results

|-
!colspan=9 style=| Exhibition

|-
!colspan=9 style=| Non-conference regular season

|-
!colspan=9 style=| WAC regular season

|- style="background:#bbbbbb"
| style="text-align:center"|Mar 5, 20207:00 pm, WAC DN
|
| Chicago State
| colspan=2 rowspan=2 style="text-align:center"|Cancelled due to the COVID-19 pandemic
| style="text-align:center"|Redhawk CenterSeattle, WA
|- style="background:#bbbbbb"
| style="text-align:center"|Mar 7, 20201:00 pm, WAC DN
| 
| Kansas City
| style="text-align:center"|ShoWare CenterKent, WA
|-
!colspan=9 style=|WAC tournament
|- style="background:#bbbbbb"
| style="text-align:center"|Mar 12, 20208:30 pm, ESPN+
| style="text-align:center"| (3)
| vs. (6) Utah ValleyQuarterfinals
| colspan=2 rowspan=1 style="text-align:center"|Cancelled due to the COVID-19 pandemic
| style="text-align:center"|Orleans ArenaParadise, NV
|-

Schedule Source:

References

Seattle Redhawks men's basketball seasons
Seattle Redhawks
Seattle Redhawks
Seattle